Dural Warriors Futsal Club is an Australian Futsal club based in Sydney, NSW. They played in the F-League which was the top tier of Australian Futsal until Football New South Wales cut the funding resulting in the collapse of the F-League. The club was founded by Dural Baptist Church and Brian Codrington in 1994.

Notable players
 Gregory Giovenali (Futsalroos representative)
 Tobias Seeto (Futsalroos representative)
 Wade Giovenali (Futsalroos representative)
 Daine Merrin (Futsalroos representative)

References

External links

Futsal clubs in Australia
Futsal clubs established in 1994
1994 establishments in Australia
Sporting clubs in Sydney